The 2010 Waikato Bay of Plenty Magic season saw Waikato Bay of Plenty Magic compete in the 2010 ANZ Championship. With a team coached by Noeline Taurua and captained by Laura Langman, Magic finished the regular season third behind New South Wales Swifts and Adelaide Thunderbirds. They subsequently defeated Southern Steel in the minor semi-final and Swifts in the preliminary final but lost to Thunderbirds in the grand final.

Players

Player movements

Roster

Regular season

Fixtures and results
Round 1

Round 2

Round 3

Round 4

Round 5

Round 6
 received a bye.
Round 7

Round 8

Round 9

Round 10

Round 11

Round 12

Round 13

Round 14

Final table

Playoffs

Minor semi-final

Preliminary final

Grand final

Gallery

References

2010
2010 ANZ Championship season
2010 in New Zealand netball